The Worshipful Company of Water Conservators is one of the Livery Companies of the City of London.

In 1988, some members of the Select Society of Sanitary Sludge Shovelers (5S), who were also members of the Institution of Water and Environmental Management (IWEM; chartered in 1995, now CIWEM), founded the Guild of Water Conservators. It was recognised as a company in 1994. Its petition for livery was granted by the Court of Aldermen with effect from 2000.

The Water Conservators' Company ranks 102nd in the order of precedence of the City Livery Companies.

The supporters of the Company's coat of arms consist of a beaver and an otter. Each of them is holding a golden shovel to recognise the part played by the British chapter of the 5S (whose badge is a golden shovel) in the formation of the guild.

The Company's church is St Mary-at-Hill.

References

External links
Worshipful Company of Water Conservators website

Water Conservators
1994 establishments in England
Water management